The Association of Test Publishers or ATP is an established non-profit trade association representing providers of tests and assessment tools and/or services related to assessment, selection, screening, certification, licensing, educational or clinical uses.

External links
 

Publishing organizations
International organizations based in the United States